Evgeniy Poddubny ( aka Evgeny Poddubny or Yevgeniy Poddubny; born August 22, 1983, Belgorod, Belgorod Region, USSR) is a Russian war correspondent and propagandist , special correspondent for Russia-24 and Russia-1 television channels.

Biography 
Poddubny was born on 22 August 1983, in Belgorod. His father, Evgeniy Pavlovich Poddubny, and mother, Irina Mikhailovna Poddubnaya are surgeons. He received his primary education in 20th secondary school in Belgorod. He graduated from Belgorod State University, with a master's degree in psychology. He speaks English and currently studying Arabic.
From 2001 to 2011, he worked as a special correspondent in the Directorate of Information Programs at the "TV Center" channel. Since September 2011, he has been a special correspondent for Russia-24 and Russia-1. Covered local conflicts in different countries. He has repeatedly worked in the Russian-occupied territories of Georgia and Ukraine, where he justified war crimes and Russian aggression against those countries.

On February 23, 2018, war correspondents Evgeniy Poddubny and Alexander Sladkov performed a song together with Joseph Kobzon at a holiday concert in the Kremlin dedicated to the 100th anniversary of the Red Army and Defender of the Fatherland Day.

In 2018, Evgeniy Poddubny became a confidant of Vladimir Putin as a candidate in a presidential elections.

Work in Ukraine

Poddubny is frequently described as one of the Kremlin's 'main' / 'lead' propagandists, and his work is frequently cited as 'Kremlin propaganda'.
 

From early 2014, Evgeny Poddubny, as a special correspondent for the Russia-24 TV channel, has covered the Revolution of Dignity, the Russian annexation of Crimea, the Russo-Ukrainian war. Poddubny's reporting has consistently aligned with the position of the Kremlin - he calls the invasion of Russian troops in Ukraine a "special operation" and spreads propaganda narratives about Ukraine as a Neo-Nazi state. Denies Russian war crimes against civilians, provides "expert" comments, creates a positive image of the Russian military, and spoil the image of Ukrainian government and the Armed Forces of Ukraine. Security Service of Ukraine declares suspicion to Poddubny for his illegal activity in Ukraine.

In May 2022, thanks to a report by Evgeniy Poddubny and Alexander Kots, the Ukrainian military managed to locate and destroy the Russian military equipment, that had previously destroyed the bridge between the cities of Sievierodonetsk and Lysychansk. On July 9, 2022, the Security Service of Ukraine and the Prosecutor General's Office of Ukraine informed Evgeniy Poddubny that he was suspected of distributing materials in which he justified Russia's aggression against Ukraine and supported the actions of the Russian military.

He has been accused of being 'illegally in Ukraine', and 'justifying Russian war crimes in Ukraine'.

Work in Syria
As a Russia-24 special correspondent, Poddubny has repeatedly reported from Syria, covering the confrontation between the government and the armed opposition during the civil war in Syria. His reporting has consistently followed the Kremlin narrative. On September 16, 2012, his film "The Battle for Syria" premiered on the Russia-24 TV channel. The film was translated into several European languages. In June 2013, Foreign Ministry of Turkmenistan accused the Russia-1 and Russia-24 TV channels and Poddubny himself of violating elementary standards of journalistic ethics for his report "Syrian Jihad Turns the Opposition into Radicals." The report focused on the fact that one of the Al-Qaeda suicide bombers in Aleppo is coordinated by Ravshan Gazakov, a citizen of Turkmenistan. 

On September 12, 2013, the Russia-24 TV channel aired an exclusive interview with the President of the Syrian Arab Republic Bashar al-Assad, which the head of state gave to Evgeniy Poddubny. In the conversation, President Assad stated publicly for the first time that the Syrian Arab Republic is acceding to the Chemical Weapons Convention and transferring arsenals of chemical warfare agents and production facilities for destruction under the supervision of OPCW monitors to international control. As a result of the interview with President Bashar al-Assad, U.S. President Barack Obama renounced his intentions to conduct a large-scale military operation against the SAR.

In April 2018, Poddubny conducted an investigation into the circumstances of the chemical attack in the Syrian city of Douma, which refuted the involvement of Syrian government troops, supporting the Assad regime's denials of involvement. However, investigative journalists from The New York Times and Bellingcat found that the Syrian military most likely carried out the chemical attack, dropping a cylinder of chlorine gas from a helicopter.

In April 2021, at the monthly UN Security Council meeting on chemical weapons in Syria, U.S. representative to the UN Linda Thomas-Greenfield stressed that Russia was obstructing efforts to hold the Syrian government accountable.

International sanctions
On May 4, 2022, the UK imposed sanctions against Evgeniy Poddubny for spreading disinformation and propaganda about the events in Ukraine. Russian military propagandists Alexander Kots and Dmitry Steshin were also included in sanctions list. They were banned from entering the UK and their British assets are frozen.  On May 18, 2022, Australia imposed sanctions against Evgeniy Poddubny, Alexander Kots, and Dmitry Steshin.

Awards
Medal "Participant of the Military Operation in Syria" of the Russian Ministry of Defense (2016)

Medal "Valor and Bravery" of the Investigative Committee of the Russian Federation (2020)

See also 

  Alexander Kots
 Semen Pegov
 Anatoly Shariy
 Alexander Sladkov
 Dmitry Steshin 
 Russian information war against Ukraine

References 

1983 births
Living people
Russian war correspondents
Russian journalists
People from Belgorod
Russian propagandists